Jean-Pierre Talbot (born 12 August 1943) is a Belgian actor, best known for his lead role of Tintin in the movies Tintin and the Golden Fleece and Tintin and the Blue Oranges.

Biography
A teacher by profession, Talbot was first noted for his physical resemblance to that of Tintin while a sports instructor on a beach in Ostend. He was introduced to Hergé and the two became friends immediately. Talbot played the comic book character Tintin in the two Tintin live action films, Tintin and the Golden Fleece (Tintin et le mystère de la Toison d'or) (directed by Jean-Jacques Vierne in 1960) and Tintin and the Blue Oranges (Tintin et les Oranges Bleues) (directed by Philip Condroyer in 1964). In 1967, a third movie was scheduled but then cancelled.

Talbot did not have other movie roles and pursued a career in teaching. He was headmaster of the King Baudouin Free School before retiring. He currently resides in Spa, Belgium. Jean-Pierre Talbot enjoys tennis, skiing and canicross. He is married and has one daughter and 3 grandchildren.

In 2007 he appeared in an RTBF documentary, Quelque chose en nous... de Tintin, marking  Hergé's centenary. His autobiography, J'étais Tintin au cinéma (Editions Jourdan, 2007) has received the Press Prize at the Prix Saint-Michel 2008 in Brussels.

Filmography

References

External links
Article about the Hergé centenary documentary (in French)

1943 births
Living people
People from Spa, Belgium
Belgian male actors
Belgian schoolteachers